The Ridin' Renegade (also known as The Riding Renegade) is a 1928 American silent Western film directed by Wallace Fox for Film Booking Offices of America (FBO) and starring Bob Steele, Nancy Drexel and Lafe McKee. The film was distributed by FBO and commercially released in the United States on February 19, 1928.

Cast
 Bob Steele as Bob Taylor 
 Nancy Drexel as Janet Reynolds
 Lafe McKee as Sheriff Jim Taylor
 Bob Fleming as Ed Stacey
 Ethan Laidlaw as Pete Hobart

See also
 Bob Steele filmography

External links
 
 
 

1928 films
1928 Western (genre) films
Films directed by Wallace Fox
American black-and-white films
Film Booking Offices of America films
Silent American Western (genre) films
1920s American films
1920s English-language films